James Forrest (born 1894) was a Scottish footballer who played mainly as a centre half, featuring for Clyde (eight years) and Cowdenbeath in Scotland, Preston North End in England and Bethlehem Steel and Providence Clamdiggers in the United States.

Forrest was selected once for the Scottish Football League XI against the English Football League XI in 1921.

References

1894 births
Year of death unknown
20th-century deaths
People from Lesmahagow
Footballers from South Lanarkshire
Scottish footballers
Association football central defenders
Scottish Junior Football Association players
Lesmahagow F.C. players
Maryhill F.C. players
Clyde F.C. players
Preston North End F.C. players
Cowdenbeath F.C. players
Providence Clamdiggers players
Bethlehem Steel F.C. (1907–1930) players
Scottish Football League players
Scottish Football League representative players
English Football League players
American Soccer League (1921–1933) players
Scottish expatriate sportspeople in the United States
Expatriate soccer players in the United States
Scottish expatriate footballers